The Philippine twenty-five-centavo coin (25¢) coin is the third-lowest denomination coin of the Philippine peso.

During Spanish administration, coins valued at 1/4 a Spanish dollar (or peso) or two reales issued by Spain and Spanish America were generally accepted in the Philippines for 25 centimos. Following the 1864 release of the 20-centimo coin, however, a 25-centimo denomination was not issued until the end of the Spanish and American administrations.

The first coin of the independent Philippines to be worth a quarter of a peso was issued in 1958 as twenty-five centavos (the name for the sub-unit under American rule). Its obverse featured a woman near a volcano. The denomination was written in English around its outside with the year at the bottom. On the reverse was the coat of arms of the Philippines and around it the inscription 'Central Bank of the Philippines'. The last issue of the coin was in 1966.

History

Independence

English Series 
In 1958, minting of the centavo resumed with another coat of arms on the reverse. The inscription around the coat of arms was changed to 'Central Bank of the Philippines'.

Pilipino Series 
In 1969, the coin featured the Tagalog language for the first time. Its obverse featured Juan Luna in profile to the left, a Filipino painter, sculptor and a political activist of the Philippine Revolution during the late 19th century. The inscription around the shield on its reverse read 'Republika ng Pilipinas'.

Ang Bagong Lipunan Series 
A second silver-colored coin featuring Luna was minted from 1975 to 1983. The name of the Republic was moved to the obverse. On the reverse read the inscription 'Ang Bagong Lipunan'. The issues from 1979 to 1982 featured a mintmark underneath the 25 centavo.

Flora and Fauna Series 
From 1983 to 1994, a new gold-colored coin was issued with Luna faced to the right in profile, and the denomination was moved to the reverse with the date on the obverse.

BSP Coin Series 
Issued from 1995 to 2003 in brass and from 2004 to 2018 in brass-plated steel, the twenty-five sentimo coin featured the name of the republic, date of issue and denomination on the obverse. The reverse side featured the 1993 logo of the Bangko Sentral ng Pilipinas.

New Generation Currency Coin Series 
Issued in 2018 and minted in nickel-plated steel, the twenty-five cent coin features a stylized representation of the Philippine flag, the three stars and the sun, the denomination and year of minting on the obverse. The reverse side features the Katmon (Dillenia philippinensis) and the current logo of the Bangko Sentral ng Pilipinas.

Version history

References 

Currencies of the Philippines
Twenty-five-cent coins